Scathophaga litorea is a species of fly in the family Scathophagidae. It is found in the  Palearctic.

References

Scathophagidae
Insects described in 1819
Muscomorph flies of Europe